Bølling can refer to:

Bølling lake, Denmark – a shallow lake in central Jutland, after which the following are named:
The Bølling Oscillation or Interstadial – a warm phase during the last phase of the Weichsel glaciation in Europe; often referred to as a part of the Bølling–Allerød period, which includes the Older Dryas stadial between them.
The Bølling Phase – a biostratigraphic subdivision during the early post-glacial period in Europe